Petrona García y Morales (April 29, 1817 – August 17, 1857) was a Guatemalan woman. She was the wife of Guatemalan President Rafael Carrera, the first president of Guatemala.

Biography 
She was born in Mataquescuintla of humble origins. Subsequently, she married Rafael Carrera in 1833. During the battles of Rafael Carrera stand out: the barracks of Mataquescuintla; the one of Ambelis in Santa Rosa, defeating the army commanded by Teodoro Mejía; that of December 7, 1837 in the Jalapa plaza where he was defeated; and on January 13, 1838, where the Guatemalan Garrison was attacked. Some of these military events were accompanied by regrettable acts committed by both sides, such as robberies, assaults, raids and murders of defenseless people. In particular, the government of Gálvez, upon learning that Carrera was the leader of the revolt, invaded Mataquescuintla and captured his wife, Petrona García, whom the soldiers took by force; when he heard Carrera, he swore to avenge the outrage against his wife, and accompanied by her, he restarted the fight with new vigor. Petrona Garcia, inflamed by the desire for revenge, committed numerous atrocities against the Liberal troops, to the point that many of the members of Carrera feared her more than the leader himself, even though Carrera by then showed the features of leadership and military expertise that would characterize it.

Petrona García Morales subsequently stayed with Rafael Carrera during his administration. In 1857 an epidemic of cholera broke out that caused many deaths in the country, including that of Petrona García. Three days of national mourning were decreed.

References

1817 births
1857 deaths
First ladies of Guatemala